A Girl Like Her is an American found footage drama film directed by Amy S. Weber. The film stars Lexi Ainsworth as Jessica Burns, a 15-year-old bullied high school student who attempts suicide, and Hunter King as Avery Keller, the fellow student who relentlessly bullies Jessica over six months. The movie was originally titled The Bully Chronicles but the title was later changed.

Plot 
High school sophomore Jessica Burns (Lexi Ainsworth) attempts suicide by taking a handful of pills from her mother's medicine cabinet. She is rushed to a hospital after her mother finds her unconscious.

The school Jessica attends has won a chance for a documentary for being the only public school to place as one of the top ten schools across the country. During filming, the cameras catch students grieving over Jessica. The crew starts interviewing kids about Jessica, and they all claim to have noticed subtle tension between her and her former best friend, Avery Keller (Hunter King). According to Jessica's best friend Brian (Jimmy Bennett), the two fell out after Jessica prevented Avery from cheating off of her test in class, and Avery had been relentlessly bullying Jessica since. Avery casually denies this, claiming they simply drifted apart after transitioning from middle to high school.

In response to the rumors, Avery agrees to record footage of her daily life to demonstrate the pressures of being popular. Though Avery herself is desensitized to it, her footage demonstrates that she comes from a dysfunctional family, and that her peers tend to feel intimidated by her teasing and controlling nature (for example, she and her clique restrict other girls from using a specific restroom while they apply their makeup).

Brian eventually confesses to the camera crew that six months ago, he and Jessica agreed to document Avery's harassment of her with a hidden camera disguised as a brooch. He invites them into his home to show them the footage, which shows Avery constantly physically and verbally antagonizing Jessica, including floods of social media messages encouraging Jessica to kill herself. The footage also shows Jessica alluding to having suicidal thoughts and Brian trying to convince her to show the footage to school faculty, to which Jessica frantically refused out of embarrassment and fear of Avery. While visiting Jessica in the hospital, Brian confesses to her mother that he had been withholding the footage - though upset, she reassures Brian that he should not blame himself for what happened to Jessica.

The students grow further convinced that the rumors of Avery's bullying are true, causing the members of Avery's clique to turn on her and present a statement to the principal. This prompts a conference between Avery, her parents, and the principal, during which Avery's parents staunchly defend her before she storms out in frustration. She later posts an insensitive video ranting about Jessica's suicide attempt and vehemently insisting on her own innocence. The camera crew approaches Avery, advising her to remove the video and telling her they have footage of her bullying Jessica. She agrees to meet them at her house that night to watch the footage.

Later that night at the hospital, Jessica's parents are visiting her when she loses her pulse. Her parents and the cameras are kicked out of the ICU, as the doctors attempt to revive Jessica. The doctors are able to regain Jessica's pulse, but say that she will eventually succumb to total organ failure if she doesn't wake from the coma soon. At her house, Avery watches the footage and begins to cry hysterically, admitting that she regrets her actions while the filmmaker consoles her. Avery posts another video, this time tearfully apologizing and stating that no person deserves to be treated the way she treated Jessica. She ends the video with, "My name is Avery Keller, and I'm a bully."

The movie ends with a cut to Jessica's face as she opens her eyes.

Cast 
 Hunter King as Avery Keller
 Lexi Ainsworth as Jessica Burns
 Jimmy Bennett as Brian Slater
 Amy S. Weber as Filmmaker/Amy Gallagher
 Stephanie Cotton as Margarete Burns
 Mark Boyd as Gerald Burns
 Christie Engle-McGuckin as Kassie Keller
 Jon Martin as David Keller
 Michael Maurice as Principle Richard Harris
 Paul Lang as Dr. Patrick Webber, M.D.

Reception 
Justin Chang of Variety gave A Girl Like Her a mixed review, lauding the film as a "well-acted, well-meaning cautionary tale", but also criticizing it as "less and less convincing the more blatantly it strives for authenticity". Sheri Linden of The Hollywood Reporter lauded the film's acting, noting that the "two young female leads, exceptionally well cast, deliver strong performances", but felt "the drama lapses into speechifying".

Rotten Tomatoes gave the film an overall "fresh" rating of 65% based on 23 reviews.

References

External links 
 
 
 
 
 

2015 films
2015 drama films
2010s American films
2010s English-language films
2010s teen drama films
American high school films
American teen drama films
Films about social media
Films about school bullying
Films about suicide
Found footage films